The Belgian football champions are the winners of the highest association football league in Belgium, currently called the Belgian Pro League and historically the Belgian First Division.

List of champions

Total titles won

 Bold - clubs play in the current top flight league.
 Italic - clubs dissolved or merged.

Total titles won by town or city
Sixteen clubs have been champions, from a total of 8 towns and cities.

See also
List of Belgian women's football champions
Football in Belgium
Belgian football league system

References

Champions
Belgium